The 2001 NATO Headquarters summit was a special Meeting of the North Atlantic Council with the participation of Heads of State and Government on June 13, 2001.

The Heads of State and Government evaluated the success of the Membership Action Plan, which assists aspiring NATO members with their preparation for membership. NATO also expressed his hope and expectation, based on the anticipated progress by aspiring members, to launch the next round of enlargement at the 2002 Prague summit.

References

2001 NATO Headquarters summit
2001 in politics
Diplomatic conferences in Belgium
21st-century diplomatic conferences (NATO)
2001 in international relations
2001 conferences
2000s in Brussels
Belgium and NATO
June 2001 events in Europe